Urassaya Sperbund (born 18 March 1993), more commonly known as Yaya, is a Thai actress and model. She is the recipient of numerous accolades including; a Suphannahong National Film Awards, a Maya Awards, a TV Gold Awards and three Mekhala Awards.

Sperbund began her acting career with the 2008 comedy sitcom Peun See Long Hon.  She received greater recognition with lead roles in Duang Jai Akkanee (2010), Game Rai Game Rak (2011),  Torranee Ni Nee Krai Krong (2012), Kleun Cheewit (2017), and The Crown Princess (2018).

Sperbund's film roles including; Brother of the Year, Nakee 2 (2018) and Fast And Feel Love (2022). For Brother of the Year, she won the Suphannahong National Film Award for Best Actress.

Early life 
Sperbund was born on 18 March 1993 in Pattaya. Her father Sigurd is Norwegian and worked as a stockbroker. Her mother Urai was a homemaker, originally from Thailand. She has one older sister, Cattreya. Sperbund attended Regent's International School Pattaya, remaining there until 2009, before transferring to Bangkok Patana School. In 2015, she graduated from Chulalongkorn University with a Faculty of Arts degree in  Spanish language.

Sperbund did her first modeling assignment at the age of 13, the result of being spotted in Chatuchak Park. She was approached by a casting director to appear in ads for Genie Young Care Cologne before stopping due to travelling difficulties. She eventually returned to modeling after being approached by Sombatsara Teerasaroch. To help Sperbund enter into the entertainment industry, the family relocated to Bangkok. From then on, she started doing photo shoots and appeared in music videos for Mr.D and C-Quint.

Acting career

2008–2015: Debut and breakthrough 

Sperbund made her television debut in 2008 by a co-starring role in the Channel 3 sitcom Peun See Long Hon. In 2010, She starred opposite Laila Boonyasak and Atshar Nampan in Kularb Rai Narm. The same year, she starred in Duang Jai Akkanee, based on the 2009 novel of the same name by Sorn Klin. The drama was incredibly popular in Thailand, and earned her the Top Awards and Siamdara Stars Awards for Best Rising Star. In 2011, She auditioned for the lead role in Tawan Dueat, directed by Atthaporn Teemakorn, with Prin Suparat as her co-star. At the 3rd Nataraja Award, she was nominated for Best Actress, but she lost to Araya A. Hargate for Dok Som See Thong.

Following Tawan Duead, Sperbund had more success starring opposite Nadech Kugimiya in Game Rai Game Rak (2011), which gained her a TV Gold Award nomination. Sperbund also lent her voice for the animation Superhero Lo Chuai Dai (2012). That same year, she played Darunee in Torranee Ni Nee Krai Krong, based on the 1974 novel of the same name by Nongchanai Prinyathawat. In 2013, she starred as Mattana in the Channel 3 series Sam Thahan Suea Sao (Maya Tawan), following which she took on another romantic role in Yutthana Leopanpaiboon's Nueng Nai Suang (2015), co-starring Jirayu Tangsrisuk.

2016–present: Subsequent work and success 
After a two-year absence from the screen, Sperbund next reunited with Prin Suparat in Kleun Cheewit (2017), a romantic drama from Ampaiporn Jitmaingong. At the 32nd TV Gold Awards, she won for Best Actress for her performance. In 2018, Sperbund appeared in two films. The first of these was opposite Sunny Suwanmethanont and Nichkhun in the romantic-comedy Brother of the Year. The film was a critical and commercial success, and Urassaya's performance received critical acclaim. A reviewer writing for the Boom Channel called her performance "attention-grabbing". She received her first Suphannahong National Film Awards and nominations for a Bangkok Critics Assembly Awards and a Starpics Thai Film Awards for Best Actress. Her next role came in the fantasy thriller Nakee 2, with co-stars Natapohn Tameeruks, Phupoom Pongpanu and Nadech Kugimiya. Despite mixed reviews, the film was a commercial success and was the tenth highest-grossing film of all time in Thailand. Also that year, she played Princess Alice in the romantic action television The Crown Princess. In February 2018, she is the first Thai actress who received the title of "Friend of Louis Vuitton" and became the first ever Thai celebrity featured in US Vogue.

Sperbund next took the lead role in San Sikaewlor's drama Klin Kasalong (2019), for which she received numerous accolades for her performance, including nominations for a Kom Chad Luek, a Nataraja, and a TV Gold Award for Best Actress. In 2022, Sperbund starred in Nawapol Thamrongrattanarit's comedy Fast and Feel Love, released on April 6, 2022. Her performance was praised by critics, with some hailing it as the best of her career. That same year, she co-starred in the Netflix series Thai Cave Rescue, which chronicles the 2018 Tham Luang cave rescue of a Thai boys' soccer team that was trapped 2.5 miles inside the cave for eighteen days as a result of a flash-flood.

Personal life 
Sperbund met Thai actor Nadech Kugimiya while filming Duang Jai Akkanee in 2010. Their relationship was reported in the media with various speculations, but the pair refused to speak publicly about it. In a November 2022 interview with The Standard Pop, Sperbund said, "Actually, we've never asked each other to be boyfriend and girlfriend. We were like, ‘When should we count as our day one?’ And I think it was during the filming of Torranee Ni Nee Krai Krong."

Filmography

Film

Television

Discography

Music videos

Concerts 
Co-headlining
 13th Kid Teung Mae (2010)
 Sam Thahan Suea Sao Limited Edition Live Show (2013)
 Love is in the Air : Channel 3 Charity Concert (2017)
Supporting
 Thongchai McIntyre – Bird Arsa Sanook (2011)
 4+1 Channel 3 Superstar Concert (2012)
 PTT The Impression Concert (2012) 
 Give Me 5 Concert Rate A (2014)
 Thaitanium – Thaitanium Unbreakable Concert (2018)
 Nadech Kugimiya – The Real Nadech Concert (2019)
 Palitchoke Ayanaputra – Peck Palitchoke 15th Anniversary The Final Odyssey Concert Concert (2020)

Accolades 

Sperbund has been nominated for numerous awards throughout her career. She was nominated for five Nataraja Award, five TV Gold Awards, and a three Mekhala Awards. She has won a Siamdara Stars Award, a Suphannahong National Film Award, a Thai Film Director Award and a Maya Award for Best Actress for Brother of the Year. She also received Rising Star Asia Award in New York Asian Film Festival.

References

External links

 
 

1993 births
Living people
Urassaya Sperbund
Urassaya Sperbund
Urassaya Sperbund
Urassaya Sperbund
Urassaya Sperbund
Urassaya Sperbund
Urassaya Sperbund